The MGV-176 is a submachine gun chambered for the .22 Long Rifle cartridge.

It was manufactured in Yugoslavia by Gorenje from Velenje until 1979. Production continued in Slovenia where it is apparently still manufactured by Orbis.

Overview
The concept of this weapon is to overcome the deficiencies of the low power rimfire cartridge by rapidly delivering a large number of projectiles. The weapon therefore relies on the .22 LR's very low recoil and a high rate of fire of 1,200 RPM. It utilized a pan magazine mounted above the barrel, with a capacity of 161 rounds.

As the .22LR is by far the cheapest and most easily accessible of all firearm cartridges, the weapon enjoys a certain popularity with enthusiasts in societies with liberal laws towards fully automatic weapons.

Operational history
MGV-176 was widely used both during the Slovenian war of independence by Slovenian territorial defense militia then by Croat volunteers during the first part of the Croatian War of Independence, notably during the so-called Battle of the Barracks.

It was however replaced as soon as a regular Croatian army was established and equipped with standard military weapons.

Users

See also
American-180 submachine gun, also chambered in .22 Long Rifle and utilizing a high-capacity pan magazine.

External links
Modern Firearms: MGV-176 submachine gun

.22 LR submachine guns
Gorenje
Weapons of Slovenia